is a Japanese actor, voice actor, singer and narrator. In June 2004, Seki was honored by the readers of Animage Magazine in the 26th Annual Reader's Poll, where he was ranked the 9th favorite voice actor, largely in recognition of his performance as Rau Le Creuset from Mobile Suit Gundam SEED. In August 2007 the Anime News Network called him one of the more prolific male voice actors with 215 roles credited to his name. Seki often voices characters who are very serious or easily agitated like Duo Maxwell in Mobile Suit Gundam Wing, Iruka Umino in Naruto, Kaien Shiba in Bleach and Genjo Sanzo in Saiyuki but he also plays deranged villains like Legato Bluesummers, Rau Le Creuset, Embryo and Muzan Kibutsuji. His most famous role is the Imagin Momotaros from Kamen Rider Den-O, reprising the role numerous productions since then. In August 2020, he contracted COVID-19 and was hospitalized. He recovered and was discharged on August 14, 2020.

Filmography

Television animation
1987
Akai Koudan Zillion, J.J.

1988
F, Gunma Akagi
Saint Seiya, Alioth Epsilon Fenrir

1989
Oishinbo, Ryōzō Okaboshi
Ranma ½, Mousse
Legend of Heavenly Sphere Shurato, Shurato
Madö King Granzört, Haribakka ̄
Yawara!, Kosaku Matsuda

1990
Idol Angel Yokoso Yoko, Akira Hayami
Mashin Hero Wataru 2, Tsuppari ̄,  Nikisaku

1991
Future GPX Cyber Formula, Bleed Kaga
Honō no Tōkyūji: Dodge Danpei, Taiga Nikaidō

1992
Oi! Ryoma, Ryōma Sakamoto (Adult)

1993
Nintama Rantarō, Doi-sensei, Ninja

1995
Mobile Suit Gundam Wing, Duo Maxwell
Neon Genesis Evangelion, Asuka's Father

1996
Kaiketsu Zorro, Zorro/Don Diego de la Vega

1997
Hyper Police, Sakunoshin Chikura

1998
Weiß Kreuz, Knight
Outlaw Star, Fred Luo, Ark Manaf
Silent Möbius, Genvara
Trigun, Legato Bluesummers
Bomberman B-Daman Bakugaiden, Kurobon

1999
Pet Shop of Horrors, Count D
Alexander Senki, Alexander

2000
Bomberman B-Daman Bakugaiden Victory, Kurobon
Baby Felix, Felix
Yami no Matsuei, Watari Yutaka
Gensomaden Saiyuki, Genjo Sanzo

2001
Final Fantasy: Unlimited, Cid
Fruits Basket, Momiji's Father
Rave Master, Shuda

2002
Mirage of Blaze, Takaya Ougi 
RahXephon, Makoto Isshiki
Naruto, Iruka Umino, Narrator
Mobile Suit Gundam SEED, Rau Le Creuset
Samurai Deeper Kyo, Benitora

2003
Saiyuuki Reload, Genjo Sanzo
Zatch Bell!, Apollo
Fullmetal Alchemist, Belsio
Kousetsu Hyaku Monogatari, Momosuke

2004
Paranoia Agent, Mitsuhiro Maniwa
Area 88, Mickey Simon
My-HiME, Reito Kanzaki
Mobile Suit Gundam SEED Destiny, Rey Za Burrel
Meine Liebe, Ludwig
Saiyuki Reload Gunlock, Genjo Sanzo

2005
Bleach, Kaien Shiba
MÄR, Danna Toramizu
My-Otome, Rado

2006
Spider Riders, Buguese
Koi suru Tenshi Angelique, Luva
Saiunkoku Monogatari, Rio Hyo, Sr.

2007
Keroro Gunsou, Urere
Higurashi When They Cry, Kyosuke Irie
Naruto: Shippuden, Iruka Umino
Kamen Rider Den-O + Shin-O, Momotaros, Kamen Rider Den-O Sword Form
Nagasarete Airantō, Kiyomasa, Benyasha

2008
Toaru Majutsu no Index, Aleister Crowley
Gunslinger Girl, Nino
Kamen Rider Den-O: Imagin Anime (Momotaros)
Yu-Gi-Oh! 5D's, Professor Frank

2009
One Piece, Duval
Bleach, Aaroniero Arruruerie

2010
Katanagatari, Umigame Maniwa
Sgt. Frog, Reiji
Psychic Detective Yakumo, Isshin Saito

2012
Pretty Rhythm: Aurora Dream, Pietro Takamine
Smile PreCure!, Hiroshi Hoshizora
Hunter × Hunter (2011), Wing

2013
Valvrave the Liberator, Soichi Tokishima
Pretty Rhythm: Rainbow Live, Hijiri Himuro
Kill la Kill, Senketsu
Gingitsune, Tatsuo Saeki

2014
Cross Ange, Embryo

2015
Symphogear GX, Akira Tachibana
Saint Seiya: Soul of Gold, Scorpio Milo

2016
Cardfight!! Vanguard G: GIRS Crisis (Season 2), Kensuke Handa
Cardfight!! Vanguard G: Stride Gate (Season 3), Kensuke Handa
Mob Psycho 100, Musashi Goda

2017
The Laughing Salesman NEW
Descending Stories: Showa Genroku Rakugo Shinju, Eisuke Higuchi
Boruto: Naruto Next Generations, Iruka Umino
Saiyuki Reload Blast, Genjo Sanzo
Elegant Yokai Apartment Life, Naomi Chiaki

2018
Gyakuten Saiban, Aiga Hoshiidake
Golden Kamuy, Henmi Kazuo

2019
Demon Slayer: Kimetsu no Yaiba, Muzan Kibutsuji
Kamen Rider Zi-O, Momotaros, Kamen Rider Den-O Sword Form
If It's for My Daughter, I'd Even Defeat a Demon Lord, Randolph
Star Twinkle PreCure, Toto

2020
Plunderer, Schmerman Bach
Higurashi: When They Cry – Gou, Kyosuke Irie
Our Last Crusade or the Rise of a New World, Salinger

2021
Higurashi: When They Cry – Sotsu, Kyosuke Irie
The Fruit of Evolution, God
The Vampire Dies in No Time, Tsujigiri Nagiri
Demon Slayer: Kimetsu no Yaiba, Muzan Kibutsuji

2022
Saiyuki Reload: Zeroin, Genjo Sanzo
Mob Psycho 100 III, Musashi Goda

2023
High Card, Norman Kingstadt
Black Clover: Sword of the Wizard King, Conrad Leto

Original video animation (OVA)

1986
Call Me Tonight, Hayata

1987
Gakuen Tokusou Hikaruon, Hikaru Shihodo

1988
Dragon Century, Carmine
Zeorymer, Masato Akitsu/Masaki Kihara

1989
 Angel Cop, Tachihara

1990
Madö King Granzört The Last Magical War, Grunwald

1991
Here is Greenwood, Shinobu Tezuka

1992
Ai no Kusabi, Riki
Bastard!!, Lord Kall-Su

1993
Please Save My Earth, Mikuro Yakushimaru

1994
Tenshi Nanka Ja Nai, Bunta Kouno
Wild 7, Dairoku Hiba

1995
 Black Jack, Umetani Tokio
 Bio Hunter, Komada

1996
Seikimatsu Darling, Todoroki Kouhei

1997
Twilight of the Dark Master, Tsunami Shijo

1998
Blue Submarine 6, Katsuma Nonaka

1999
Pet Shop of Horrors, Count D

2002
Saint Seiya: Hades, Scorpio Milo

2004
’’Mirage of Blaze: Rebels of the River Edge, Takaya Ougi

2007
’’Saiyuki Reload: Burial, Genjo Sanzo

2009
Dogs: Bullets & Carnage, Bishop
Saint Seiya: The Lost Canvas, Pope Sage

2011
Saiyuki Gaiden, Konzen Douji 

2013
Saiyuki Gaiden: Kouga no Shou, Konzen Douji 

2015
Mobile Suit Gundam: The Origin, Char Aznable

Unsorted
Future GPX Cyber Formula series (Bleed Kaga)

Original net animation (ONA)
Sword Gai: The Animation (2018), Takuma Miura

Theatrical animation
Touch 3: Don't Pass Me By (1987), Nakajima
Ryokunohara Labyrinth: Sparkling Phantom (1990), Hiroki Imanishi
Ninja Scroll (1993), Yurimaru
Ocean Waves (1993), Yutaka Matsuno
Nintama Rantarō the Movie (1996), Hansuke Doi
Violinist of Hameln the Movie (1996), Raiel
X (1996), Shōgo Asagi
Saiyuki: Requiem (2001), Genjo Sanzo
Nintama Rantarō the Movie: Ninjutsu Gakuen Zenin Shutsudō! no Dan (2011), Hansuke Doi
Detective Conan: Quarter of Silence (2011), Shōgo Hikawa
Road to Ninja: Naruto the Movie (2012), Iruka Umino
A Certain Magical Index: The Movie – The Miracle of Endymion (2013), Aleister Crowley
The Last: Naruto the Movie (2014), Iruka Umino
Black Clover: Sword of the Wizard King (2023), Konrad Leto

Video games
A Certain Magical Index: Imaginary Fest (Aleister Crowley)
Another Century's Episode 2 (Duo Maxwell)
Aisle Lord (Rōru)
Bayonetta 3 (Dr. Sigurd)
Bleach: Heat the Soul 5 (Aaroniero Arruruerie (Kaien Shiba))
Call of Duty: Advanced Warfare (Joker) (Japanese dub)
Castlevania: Order of Ecclesia (Albus)
Demon Slayer: Kimetsu no Yaiba – The Hinokami Chronicles (Muzan Kibutsuji)
Dissidia: Final Fantasy, Dissidia 012 Final Fantasy and Dissidia Final Fantasy NT (Warrior of Light)
Dynasty Warriors: Gundam 3 (Duo Maxwell)
"Dynasty Warriors: Gundam Reborn" (Duo Maxwell, Rau Le Creuset, Rey Za Burrel)
Everybody's Golf 5 (Johnson (L.J.))
Fate/Grand Order (Antonio Salieri)
Future GPX Cyber Formula series (Bleed Kaga)
Grand Sphere (Luhmer) 
Kamen Rider: Climax Heroes series (Kamen Rider Den-O Sword Form, Kamen Rider Den-O Super Climax Form)
La Pucelle: Tactics (Croix)
Naruto games (Iruka Umino)
Onmyoji (Inugami) 
Project X Zone (Kogroro Tenzai)
Ray Tracers (Jalta Lang)
Saint Seiya: Soldiers' Soul (Scorpio Milo, Alioth Epsilon Fenrir)
Saiyuki Reload and Saiyuki Reload Gunlock (Genjo Sanzo)
SD Gundam G Generation 3D (Duo Maxwell, Rau Le Creuset, Rey Za Burrel)
SD Gundam G Generation World (Def Stallion, Duo Maxwell, Rau Le Creuset, Rey Za Burrel)
Super Robot Wars series (Duo Maxwell, Perfectio, Rau Le Creuset, Rey Za Burrel, Masato Akitsu/Masaki Kihara, Embryo, Tetsuya Tsurugi (INFINITY))
Samurai Deeper Kyô (Benitora)
Stranger of Paradise: Final Fantasy Origin (Warrior of Light)
Super Monkey Ball Banana Mania (Doctor, Jet)
Tales of Destiny 2 (Loni Dunamis)
The Evil Within (Ruvik)
Virtua Fighter 4: Evolution (Goh Hinogami)
Virtua Fighter 5 (Goh Hinogami)
World of Final Fantasy (Warrior of Light)
Cookie Run Kingdom (Red Velvet Cookie)
Touken Ranbu (Ichimonji Norimune)
Genshin Impact (Dottore) 
Arknights (Chong Yue)

Tokusatsu
Denji Sentai Megaranger: (Chameleon Nejire)
Kamen Rider Den-O, Kamen Rider Den-O: I'm Born!,  Kamen Rider Den-O & Kiva: Climax Deka, Saraba Kamen Rider Den-O: Final Countdown, Kamen Rider Decade (14-15, 18), Cho Kamen Rider Den-O & Decade Neo Generations: The Onigashima Warship, Kamen Rider Decade: All Riders vs. Dai-Shocker, Kamen Rider × Kamen Rider W & Decade: Movie War 2010, Kamen Rider × Kamen Rider × Kamen Rider The Movie: Cho-Den-O Trilogy, OOO, Den-O, All Riders: Let's Go Kamen Riders, Kamen Rider × Super Sentai: Super Hero Taisen, Kamen Rider Wizard (52-53), Heisei Riders vs. Shōwa Riders: Kamen Rider Taisen feat. Super Sentai, Kamen Rider × Super Sentai: Chou Super Hero Taisen, Kamen Rider Heisei Generations Forever, Kamen Rider Zi-O (39, 40): (Momotaros/Kamen Rider Den-O Sword Form)
Kamen Rider Kiva: King of the Castle in the Demon World: (Penitentiary Officer Sanjō/Zebra Fangire)
Ultraman: Super Fighter Legend: (Ultra Seven, Ultraman Leo)

Live-action
 The Promised Neverland (2020) (Demon's voice)

Dubbing roles

Live-action
13 Going on 30 – Matt Flamhaff (Mark Ruffalo)
Alive – Antonio "Tintin" Vizintin (John Newton)
Backdraft – Probationary Firefighter Brian McCaffrey (William Baldwin)
Captain Marvel – Talos (Ben Mendelsohn)
Copycat (1998 TV Tokyo edition) – Inspector Reuben Goetz (Dermot Mulroney)
Cutthroat Island – William Shaw (Matthew Modine)
Doctor Who – Tenth Doctor (David Tennant)
The Godfather Part III – Vincent Corleone (Andy García)
A Good Day to Die Hard – Alik (Radivoje Bukvić)
Good Omens – Crowley (David Tennant)
Gremlins – Billy Peltzer (Zach Galligan)
Gremlins 2: The New Batch – Billy Peltzer (Zach Galligan)
Hocus Pocus – Thackery Binx (Sean Murray)
Hollywoodland – George Reeves (Ben Affleck)
Idiocracy – Joe Bauers (Luke Wilson)
Legend – Jack (Tom Cruise)
Oldboy – Lee Woo-jin (Yoo Ji-tae)
The Pianist – Henryk Szpilman (Ed Stoppard)
Reality Bites – Troy Dyer (Ethan Hawke)
Robin Hood – Sheriff of Nottingham (Ben Mendelsohn)
Roman Holiday (2022 NTV edition) – Mario Delani (Paolo Carlini)
Rough Magic – Cliff Wyatt (D. W. Moffett)
The Secret Life of Walter Mitty – Don Proctor (Paul Fitzgerald)
Sliver – Zeke Hawkins (William Baldwin)
Summer of Sam – Ritchie (Adrien Brody)
The Temp – Peter Derns (Timothy Hutton)
Tomcats – Michael Delaney (Jerry O'Connell)
Valerian and the City of a Thousand Planets – General Okto Bar (Sam Spruell)
Village of the Damned – Reverend George (Mark Hamill)
West Side Story (1990 TBS edition) – Chino Martin (Jose De Vega)

Awards

References

External links

 Toshihiko Seki at GamePlaza-Haruka Voice Acting Database 

1962 births
Living people
Japanese male pop singers
Japanese male stage actors
Japanese male video game actors
Japanese male voice actors
Komazawa University alumni
Male voice actors from Sendai
Male voice actors from Tochigi Prefecture
Musicians from Tochigi Prefecture
20th-century Japanese male actors
20th-century Japanese musicians
21st-century Japanese male actors
21st-century Japanese musicians
81 Produce voice actors
20th-century Japanese male singers
20th-century Japanese singers
21st-century Japanese male singers
21st-century Japanese singers